The Cat and the Canary may refer to:

The Cat and the Canary (play), a 1922 play by John Willard
 The Cat and the Canary (1927 film), a 1927 silent film by Paul Leni, based on the play
 The Cat and the Canary (1939 film), a 1939 remake of the 1927 film starring Bob Hope
 The Cat and the Canary (1961 film), a 1961 Swedish television film based on the 1927 film
 The Cat and the Canary (1978 film), a 1979 British remake of the 1927 film by Radley Metzger
 "The Cat and the Canary", a 2005 episode of Justice League Unlimited